Christoph Gerlinger (born July 27, 1967 in Frankfurt/Main, West Germany) is a German venture capitalist and Internet entrepreneur. He is best known as the founder and CEO of the former venture capital investor German Startups Group, which is publicly listed on the Frankfurt Stock Exchange and was transformed into a Private Equity firm in late 2020. Prior to that he was a senior executive and entrepreneur in computer and online games companies since 1996. He was CEO of the MMO Games publisher  (now Gameforge Berlin AG), listed at Frankfurt stock exchange from 2006 until its takeover in 2010. Gerlinger was named one of Germany's most 50 interesting young entrepreneurs by a leading German business magazine.

Education and career
Gerlinger earned a master's degree in business administration and Management from JW Goethe University Frankfurt am Main in 1992.

Early in his career, Gerlinger was CFO of the German subsidiary of Psygnosis (Sony Group)(1996 - 1998). Later he was CFO and Co-Founder of CDV Software Entertainment AG (1999 - 2001), listed at the Frankfurt Stock Exchange from 2000 until 2010, before serving as general manager of Atari's German entity Infogrames Deutschland GmbH (2002). In early 2005, Gerlinger founded the MMO Games Publisher Frogster Interactive Pictures AG in Berlin. He was Frogster's long standing CEO and worked with the team during its critical growth phases. He left Frogster at the end of 2011 after the takeover by its competitor Gameforge. He then founded German Startups Group, which was released publicly on 27 July 2012. German Startups Group based in Berlin became the second most active venture capital investor in Germany since 2012. 

In August 2020, the annual general meeting of German Startups Group resolved to merge with SGT Capital Pte. Ltd., a global Alternative Investment and Private Equity Asset Manager based in Singapore and Frankfurt, the company was renamed into SGT German Private Equity, and Gerlinger remained Managing Director and became a Partner of its Private Equity business. Gerlinger was appointed external expert of the network 'Digitalization' and member of the digital commission by the federal board of the CDU. The Federal Ministry of Economic Affairs and Energy has appointed Christoph as an advisory board member of 'Young Digital Economy' in 2020. Gerlinger regularly publishes articles and gives interviews on venture capital and economical topics. In this capacity, he and two other members authored a position paper to support IPOs in Germany in July 2021 calling for the "disciplining of the press" to give a fair and balanced opinion, which led to fierce criticism. Due to the accusations of having the intention to restrict the freedom of the press, Gerlinger resigned from the advisory board of the 'Young Digital Economy'. In the wake of the incident, the German weekly business news magazine Wirtschaftswoche questioned Gerlinger's business practices, purporting "media critic Gerlinger must be most afraid of bad press".

In June 2022 Gerlinger´s company acquired Utimaco for the investors advised by them, a global market leader for high-end cyber security software with more than 470 employees and a three-digit million revenue. This constituted the completion of transformation of the former German Startups Group into a Germany-based Private Equity asset manager under the name SGT German Private Equity.

References

External links 
Christoph Gerlinger on Facebook

1967 births
Living people
Businesspeople from Frankfurt